Carodista grypotatos is a moth in the family Lecithoceridae. It is found in Sri Lanka.

The wingspan is 21–22 mm. The forewings are clothed with brown or dark brown scales with dark brown scales in the basal one-fifth of the costa and a yellowish orange costal patch. There is also a large, elliptical blackish antemedial patch bordered by yellowish orange scales along the inner margin. The median patch is X-shaped and yellowish orange and the postmedian line is zigzag shaped. The hindwings are grey with a broad orange white fascia  to three-fourths along the costa.

Etymology
The species name refers to the horn on the ventral margin of the valva and is derived from gryp (meaning hooked).

References

Moths described in 2001
Carodista